The Ninth Federal Electoral District of Chihuahua (IX Distrito Electoral Federal de Chihuahua) is one of the 300 Electoral Districts into which Mexico is divided for the purpose of elections to the federal Chamber of Deputies and one of nine such districts in the state of Chihuahua.

It elects one deputy to the lower house of Congress for each three-year legislative period, by means of the first past the post system.

District territory
Under the 2005 districting scheme, Chihuahua's Ninth District is in the south-west portion of the state and covers the municipalities of Balleza, Batopilas, Bocoyna, Carichi, Chínipas, Cusihuiriachi, Dr. Belisario Domínguez, Gran Morelos, Guadalupe y Calvo, Guazapares, Hidalgo del Parral, Huejotitán, Maguarichi, Matamoros, Morelos, Nonoava, Rosario, San Francisco de Borja, San Francisco del Oro, Santa Bárbara, Santa Isabel, Satevó, El Tule, Urique, Uruachi and Valle de Zaragoza.

The district's head town (cabecera distrital), where results from individual polling stations are gathered together and collated, is the city of Parral.

Previous districting schemes

1996–2005 district
Between 1996 and 2005, the Ninth District was located, as now, in the south of the state and covered the municipalities of Allende, Balleza, Coronado, Guadalupe y Calvo, Hidalgo del Parral, Huejotitán, Jiménez, López, Matamoros, Rosario, San Francisco del Oro, Santa Bárbara, El Tule and Valle de Zaragoza. Its head town was the city of Parral.

1979–1996 district
Between 1979 and 1996, the Ninth District was located in the north-west of the state and its head town was the city of Nuevo Casas Grandes.

Deputies returned to Congress from this district

LI Legislature
 1979–1982: Rebeca Anchondo Fernández (PRI)
LII Legislature
 1982–1985: Servando Portillo Díaz (PRI)
LIII Legislature
 1985–1988: Fernando Abarca Fernández (PRI)
LIV Legislature
 1988–1991: Rebeca Anchondo Fernández (PRI)
LV Legislature
 1991–1994: Luis Carlos Rentería Torres (PRI)
LVI Legislature
 1994–1997: Sergio Prieto Gamboa (PRI)
LVII Legislature
 1997–2000: Jesús José Villalobos Sáenz (PRI)
LVIII Legislature
 2000–2003: Manuel Payán Nova (PRI)
LIX Legislature
 2003–2006: Jesús Aguilar Bueno (Ind.)
LX Legislature
 2006–2009: César Duarte Jáquez (PRI)
LXI Legislature
2009–2012: Luis Carlos Campos Villegas (PRI)
LXII Legislature
2012–2015: 
LXIII Legislature
2015–2018: Carlos Hermosillo Arteaga (PRI) (d. 2017)
LXIV Legislature
2018–2020: Ángeles Gutiérrez Valdez (Por México al Frente)

References and notes

Federal electoral districts of Mexico
Chihuahua (state)